Arthur "Art" or "Buzz" Demling is a former U.S. soccer defender who played in the North American Soccer League and the Major Indoor Soccer League.  He was a member of the U.S. soccer team at the 1972 Summer Olympics.  He also earned four caps with the U.S. national team between 1973 and 1975.

College
Demling grew up in St. Louis, Missouri, where he attended St. Louis University High School.  After high school, he attended Michigan State University.  In 1970, he was named a first team All American.

Professional
In 1973, Demling signed with the St. Louis Stars of the North American Soccer League (NASL).  However, he lasted only one season before moving to the expansion San Jose Earthquakes.  He played five seasons in California before leaving the NASL.  In 1978, Demling moved to the Major Indoor Soccer League (MISL) and signed with the Cincinnati Kids.  The Kids folded at the end of the season.  Demling played the 1980-1981 MISL season with the San Francisco Fog.

National and Olympic teams

Olympics
Demling was selected for the U.S. soccer team at the 1972 Summer Olympics.  The U.S. went 0-2-1.  Demling played in the third U.S. game of the tournament, a 7–0 loss to West Germany.

National team
Demling earned four caps with the U.S. national team between 1973 and 1975.  His first cap came on August 12, 1973, in a 1–0 victory over Poland.  He played one game in 1974 and two more in 1975.  His last cap came on March 26, 1975, against  Poland.  Unlike his debut match, this one ended in a 7–0 loss for the U.S.

References

External links
 NASL/MISL stats

1948 births
American soccer players
Cincinnati Kids players
Footballers at the 1972 Summer Olympics
Major Indoor Soccer League (1978–1992) players
Michigan State Spartans men's soccer players
North American Soccer League (1968–1984) players
North American Soccer League (1968–1984) indoor players
Olympic soccer players of the United States
San Francisco Fog (MISL) players
San Jose Earthquakes (1974–1988) players
St. Louis Stars (soccer) players
Soccer players from St. Louis
Living people
United States men's international soccer players
All-American men's college soccer players
Association football defenders